Usutu may refer to:

A character in Heroes, see List of Heroes characters#Usutu 
Usutu River, a name for Maputo River
Usutu virus, a Flavivirus